Elizabeth Shakman Hurd (born 1970) is an American political scientist. She is professor of political science and religious studies and holds the Crown Chair in Middle East Studies at Northwestern University in Evanston, Illinois.

Academic career 
Hurd was educated at Wesleyan University (B.A.), Yale University (M.A.), and Johns Hopkins University (Ph.D). She has taught at Northwestern University since 2002. Hurd is known for her work on Religion and politics in the United States, religion and Foreign policy of the United States, and religion and international relations. She also studies relations between the United States and the Middle East, particularly Turkey and Iran. Her writings have appeared in Boston Review, Public Culture, The Atlantic, Chicago Tribune, Foreign Policy, and The Washington Post. Her research has been supported by the Henry Luce Foundation and the American Council of Learned Societies/Luce Program in Religion, Journalism and International Affairs. She is a long-time contributor to The Immanent Frame digital forum on Secularism, religion, and the public sphere and a founding member of the Program in Middle East and North African Studies at Northwestern University.

Selected publications 

 The Politics of Secularism in International Relations (Princeton University Press, 2008)
 Beyond Religious Freedom: The New Global Politics of Religion (Princeton University Press, 2015)
 Theologies of American Exceptionalism (co-edited, Indiana University Press, 2020)
 Politics of Religious Freedom (co-edited, University of Chicago, 2015)
 Comparative Secularisms in a Global Age (co-edited, Palgrave Macmillan, 2010)

References 

Wesleyan University alumni
Yale University alumni
Johns Hopkins University alumni
1970 births
Living people
Northwestern University faculty
American women political scientists
American political scientists
21st-century American women writers
American women social scientists
American women academics